Baby Bell (born María Isabel Gómez Bell; January 26, 1943 – 2000)  was an Argentine-born Mexican actress and singer. She was perhaps best known for starring in the film Cada quién su lucha.

Filmography

Film
(1965) El último cartucho
(1965) Millonario a go go
(1966) Cada quién su lucha 
(1967) Las hijas de Elena

Television
(1985) Las amazonas (TV series)

References

External links

Mexican film actresses
Argentine film actresses
20th-century Argentine women singers
Argentine emigrants to Mexico
1943 births
2000 deaths
20th-century Mexican women singers